Allahka (also Romanized as Allahkā; also known as Laleh Gāh and Pā’īn Maḩalleh-ye Leleh Kāh) is a village in Chukam Rural District, Khomam District, Rasht County, Gilan Province, Iran. At the 2006 census, its population was 1,869, in 525 families.

References 

Populated places in Rasht County